Regina Carvalho Pereira (born 13 August 1992) is a Portuguese football defender who plays for Famalicão and the Portugal women's national football team.

External links 
 
 
 Profile at S.C. Braga 

1992 births
Living people
People from Barcelos, Portugal
Portuguese women's footballers
Portugal women's international footballers
Women's association football defenders
Sportspeople from Braga
Valadares Gaia F.C. (women) players
S.C. Braga (women's football) players
Portuguese beach soccer players
F.C. Famalicão (women) players